The Cascade Bicycle Club is a nonprofit 501(c)(3) 91-2165219 community organization based in Seattle, Washington in the United States. It is the largest statewide bicycling nonprofit in the United States with more than 8,900 members. It is run by a volunteer board of directors, 28 professional staff, and more than 250 volunteers.

Major events
Cascade hosts several major riding events every year including Chilly Hilly, Seattle Bike-n-Brews, Ride for Major Taylor, Flying Wheels Summer Century, Woodinville Wine Ride, Seattle Night Ride, the Red-Bell 100, Seattle to Portland (STP), Ride from Seattle to Vancouver and Party (RSVP), Ride Around Washington (RAW), High Pass Challenge (HPC), and Kitsap Color Classic (KCC). Ride participation varies from 200 - 10,000 per event.

Rides and tours
Cascade volunteer ride leaders lead more than 2,000 free group rides a year. The club also leads regional tours. Cascade rides are open to anyone wearing a helmet.

Advocacy
In addition to producing material for the public on bicycling, the Cascade Bicycle Club lobbies local government on behalf of people who ride bikes. Advocacy staff produced a paper titled "Left by the Side of the Road" asserting the shortfall of safe, effective bicycle routes in the region.

From 2009-2011 the club successfully lobbied for a law to increase penalties for negligent drivers who injured or killed vulnerable users of the road, including bicyclists and pedestrians. The club found that under state law, drivers were fined as low as $42. A version of the Vulnerable User Bill passed in 2011 with wide bipartisan support. The bill increased mandatory fines, but allowed the fines to be reduced by a judge, who could proscribe driver safety education and community service.

The Cascade Bicycle lobbies have petitioned for extending and building trails along the Burke-Gilman Trail through the industrial waterfront of Ballard. After local businesses obstructed progress of the project, the club joined the City of Seattle in a lawsuit to move trail construction forward.

References

External links 

Cycling in Washington (state)
Organizations based in Seattle
Organizations established in 1970
Cycling organizations in the United States
1970 establishments in Washington (state)